Kunaina Diab (كنينه ذياب) is a Syrian writer, was born in Jableh, Lattakia, in 1948. She is a member of the Syrian branch of the Arab Writers Union. She graduated from Damascus University with a BA in arts from the Department of English Language and a BA in Mass Communication from the Department of Open Education at Damascus University in 2018. She has written several children's stories as well as translations.

Compositions 
English translations

 Dawn of the Desert, translated novel, Dialogue House, Syria, 2007.
 Desert Flower, Translated Novel, Dialogue House, Syria, 2008.
 Desert Girls, Translated Novel, Dialogue House, Syria, 2008.
 When the night bird sings: Translated Stories, Arab Writers' Union, Syria, 2008.
 Golden Cadillac: Translated Stories - East and West House, Syria, 2014.
 Dear traitor: Translated Stories, Arab Writers' Union, Syria, 2015.
 If children run the world: Book for Children and Young People, participating in Cultural Bridges magazine, 13–14, Ministry of Culture - Syrian Public Book Authority, Damascus, 2019.

Kids publication and young people.

 Bedtime Tales 90 Stories, Children's Story Collection, Spring Publishing House, Syria 2007.
 Colored Leaves, Children's Story Collection, Spring Publishing House - 2010.
 The Sun Told the Moon, Children's Story Collection, Spring Publishing House, 2010.
 Sham Swimming in Winter, Children's Story Collection, Spring Publishing House - 2010
 Little Flute, Children's Story Collection, Spring Publishing House - 2010.
 Fares farewell to childhood: A Long Story for Young People, Arab Writers Union in Mishq - 2010.
 Letters to my father: Stories of Young and Young People - The League of Arab Writers in Damascus, 2012.
 Tomorrow's shoots: Stories for Children, Ministry of Culture, Children's Publications, 2016.

Children's Story Series, Dar Al-Hafid, Damascus, 2019:

Sinan and Toothbrush, Al Hafid House, Damascus, 2019.

Al-Muhammad House, Damascus, 2019.

Horse cart, Al Hafid House, Damascus, 2019.

I will become a carpenter, Al Hafid House, Damascus, 2019.

Blue Sparrow, Al Hafid House, Damascus, 2019.

Filowla and Al-Muzammar, Dar Al-Hafid, Damascus, 2019.

Benevolent Frog, Al-Hafid House, Damascus, 2019.

The Strange Duck, Dar Al-Hafid, Damascus, 2019.

Ajib Shoe, Dar Al-Hafiz, Damascus, 2019.

Mad Moon, Al Hafid House, Damascus, 2019.

Collection of six stories in Arabic and English:

 Little Squirrel, Shan Publishing House, Amman Jordan, 2020.
 Small Painter, Shan Publishing House, Amman Jordan, 2020.
 Poor Elephant, Shan Publishing House, Amman Jordan, 2020.
 Small Worm, Shan Publishing House, Amman Jordan, 2020.
 Rama and the Book, Shan Publishing House, Amman Jordan, 2020.
 My friend's Sutter : A Story for Young People, Dar Al-Huda Zahalqa, West Bank, Palestine, 2019 .
 Between a butterfly and an ant: Children's Story Collection, Arab Writers' Union, Damascus, 2020.
 Stories published in Osama Magazine, Children's Publications, Ministry of Culture, Syria, 2008–2019.
 Stories and Comics (screenplay) published in Shama Magazine, Children's Publications, Ministry of Culture, Syria 2019.
 Stories and Comics (screenplay) for Children for Qanber magazine, Iraq, 2019, 2020.
 Children's Stories for Jassim Magazine, State of Qatar, 2020.
 Stories for Children for the Moroccan magazine Waz, Ministry of Culture, Morocco, 2019.
 Stories for Children for Qatar Al Nada, Egypt, 2019.
 Stories for Children published in Shalil, published by the Sudan Children's Book Association, 2020–2021.

References

Syrian women writers
Syrian writers
1948 births
Living people